Jane White Is Sick & Twisted is a 2002 American comedy film written and directed by David Michael Latt, produced by The Asylum, and starring Kim Little. It is one of few films by the studio not to be made to capitalize on another film, and is also one of few Asylum films to have a theatrical release.

Plot 
The film follows Jane White (Kim Little), a teenager who is obsessed with television, and dreams of becoming a TV celebrity. Jane is also convinced that she is the daughter of a prominent talk-show host, and aspires to appear on that show in the hope of launching her career as a television actress.

Cast

Awards and nominations
Colin Mochrie won a B-Movie Award for Best B-Movie Hollywood Appearance or Cameo.

External links 
 Jane White Is Sick & Twisted at The Asylum
 
 Reviews
 eFilmCritic
 Variety
 Boxoffice Magazine

2002 comedy films
2002 independent films
2002 films
American comedy films
The Asylum films
Films about actors
Films directed by David Michael Latt
American independent films
2000s English-language films
2000s American films